Mohammad Sa'ed Maraghei (28 April 1881 – 1 November 1973) was the 27th Prime Minister of Iran.

Early life
Sa'ed was born in Maragheh, and studied at the University of Lausanne.

Prime Minister
Sa'ed became prime minister after the fall of Ali Soheili's cabinet in 1943. Iran-Russia relations fell to low levels during his government after Sa'ed refused to entertain a Soviet demand for an oil concession in Soviet-occupied Northern Iran. Sergei Kavtaradze publicly attacked the Prime Minister and demanded his resignation. The Soviet and Tudeh press echoed Kavtaradze's words. The Soviets inspired their Tudeh comrades in Iran to strike and demonstrate until Sa'ed resigned. Sa'ed resigned on 10 November 1944. 

He banned the Tudeh Party during his premiership, and Arthur Millspaugh was also re-appointed finance minister under his administration. It is said that he used public transportation (such as bus), even when he was a senator. He was fluent in Russian, French, and Turkish.

See also
Pahlavi dynasty
List of prime ministers of Iran

References

The following reference was used for the above writing: 'Alí Rizā Awsatí, Iran in the Past Three Centuries (Irān dar Se Qarn-e Goz̲ashteh), Volumes 1 and 2 (Paktāb Publishing, Tehran, Iran, 2003).  (Vol. 1),  (Vol. 2).

External links

Prime Ministers of Iran
1880s births
1973 deaths
Burials at Behesht-e Zahra
University of Lausanne alumni
People from Maragheh
20th-century Iranian politicians